Lee Wright may refer to:

 Lee Wright (programmer) (born 1970), British computer and video game programmer
 Lee Wright (field hockey) (born 1944), Canadian former field hockey player